Dark Funeral (originally an untitled EP) is the debut EP by Swedish black metal band Dark Funeral, released in 1994.

In the Sign... is a compilation EP and a re-release of Dark Funeral, with two extra tracks taken from the Bathory tribute album . Remastered at Cutting Room Studios, November 1999.

Track listing

Personnel

Dark Funeral
Themgoroth – vocals and bass (1–4)
Lord Ahriman – guitars (1-6)
Blackmoon – guitars (1-4)
Draugen – drums (1-4)

In the Sign... additional personnel
Emperor Magus Caligula – vocals and bass 
Typhos - guitar 
Alzazmon – drums

References

External links
Lyrics at official website

Dark Funeral albums
1994 EPs
Albums produced by Dan Swanö

pt:Dark Funeral#EPs